Sociedad Deportiva Ejea is a Spanish football team based in Ejea de los Caballeros, in the autonomous community of Aragon. Founded in 1927, it plays in Segunda División RFEF – Group 3, holding home games at Municipal de Ejea, with a 2,249-seat capacity.

History
SD Ejea was founded on October 3, 1927 by the merging of Setia Foot-ball Club, Numancia Foot-ball Club and Sporting Foot-ball Club. Higinio Villacampa Murillo became its first president.  

After competing in all categories of Aragonese regional football, Ejea was for the first time promoted to the Tercera División in 1956-57 season, also reaching the final of the Aragon Championship of Fans. 

On 24 June 2018, Ejea promoted for the first time ever to Segunda División B after defeating three reserve teams in the promotion playoffs.

After a first season in the third division where the club successfully avoided relegation, on 27 June 2019, Ejea agreed collaboration terms with SD Huesca to become their reserve team for the 2019–20 season. On 25 June, 2019 Javi Suárez was appointed the new head coach. He substituted Guillermo Fernández Romo, who saved the club in Segunda División B in its debut season in the league.

Season to season

3 seasons in Segunda División B
1 season in Segunda División RFEF
44 seasons in Tercera División

Notes

Honours

 Tercera División
Winners (3): 1957–58, 2007–08, 2011–12

Current squad

References

External links
Official Club's website 
Club & stadium history Estadios de España 

Football clubs in Aragon
Association football clubs established in 1941
1941 establishments in Spain
SD Huesca
Province of Zaragoza